Sant Pathik Vidyalaya is a senior secondary school established in 1987. The school is situated in Pashupatinagar, India, 11 kilometers (7 miles) away from  Bahraich city on NH 28C.

History
In 1987 the school was started by A. N. Agarwal with the motive to teach the students residing in rural areas. The name of school comes from the name of the saint Sant Pathik Ji Maharaj.

Mode of teaching
Sant Pathik is recognized to the CBSE, New Delhi. The mode of teaching is strictly according to the syllabus prescribed by the government of India and National Council of Educational Research and Training. Sant Pathik is a fully English medium school from class Playway to 10+2.

Streams
Sant Pathik provides three streams for students:
Commerce
Science
Humanities

References

Official website

Schools in Uttar Pradesh
Educational institutions established in 1987
Primary schools in Uttar Pradesh
Bahraich district
1987 establishments in Uttar Pradesh